The Night Falls (Spanish: La noche avanza) is a 1952 Mexican crime film directed by Roberto Gavaldón and starring Pedro Armendáriz, Anita Blanch and Rebeca Iturbide. Armendariz delivers a particularly energetic performance.

The film's sets were designed by the art director Edward Fitzgerald.

Cast

References

Bibliography 
  R. Hernandez-Rodriguez. Splendors of Latin Cinema. ABC-CLIO, 2009.

External links 
 

1952 films
1952 crime films
Mexican crime films
1950s Spanish-language films
Films directed by Roberto Gavaldón
Mexican black-and-white films
1950s Mexican films